Renoise Tracks 2009-2011 is the second internet album by John Frusciante, released independently on November 24, 2015 via his Bandcamp and SoundCloud webpages.

Background 
The songs on the album were all recorded between 2009 and 2011 in Frusciante's main studio during various stages of its development while he was working to expand his knowledge of engineering electronic music which he decided to pursue in 2007.  This album is free to download from Frusciante's official Bandcamp and Soundcloud pages and was released along with the 4-Track Guitar Music EP as well as a few other single songs.  Frusciante explained his decision to make the release free saying, "It is my conviction that music should always be made because one loves music, regardless of whether one plans on selling it or not."

Track listing

Personnel 
 John Frusciante – all instruments
 Aura T-09 – cover art, design

References 

2015 albums
John Frusciante albums